was a Japanese ukiyo-e artist who was a student of Utagawa Hiroshige.

Born , he was given the artistic name Shigemasa. In 1867, after Hiroshige II, a fellow pupil of the original Hiroshige, divorced the master's daughter Otatsu, Gotō married her and initially took on the name Hiroshige II as well, but by 1869 he began calling himself Hiroshige III.

Hiroshige III worked in the same artistic style as his master, but did not achieve anywhere near the same level of success.

Gallery 

From The most beautiful place in Tokyo (東京名所第一の勝景, Tōkyō meisho dai ichi no shōkei)

See also 
 Utagawa school
 Ukiyo-e

References

External links

Prints 
Ukiyo-e Prints by Utagawa Hiroshige III

Biographies 
Biography of Utagawa Hiroshige III, British Museum

1842 births
1894 deaths
19th-century Japanese painters
Ukiyo-e artists
Utagawa school